Aleksey Semenovich Chuyanov (Russian: Алексей Семёнович Чуянов; 30 March 1905 – 20 February 1977) was a Soviet politician who served as the First Secretary of the Stalingrad Regional Committee of the Communist Party of the Soviet Union from 1938 to 1946.

Early life and education 
Chuyanov was born on March 30, 1905 in the Temryuk in the Russian Empire. At the age of thirteen, he began working as a shepherd, farmer, and fisherman in Kuban. He graduated from the Moscow Chemical-Technological Institute of the Meat Industry in 1937, he also briefly worked as a mechanical engineer from 1934 to 1936.

Political career 
Chuyanov joined the Communist Party of the Soviet Union in 1925 and worked as the head of the Department of Agitation and Propaganda, and the First Secretary of numerous district committees of the Komsomol until 1927. He continued to work in various positions from 1927 to 1929. 

From 1937 to 1938, he worked as the Instructor of the Department of Leading Party Workers of the Central Committee of the Communist Party of the Soviet Union. He then served as the First Secretary of the Stalingrad Regional Committee of the Communist Party of the Soviet Union from June 22, 1938 to December 6, 1946. He was a candidate member of the Central Committee of the Communist Party of the Soviet Union from 1939 to 1952 and a deputy to the Supreme Soviet of the Soviet Union from 1941 to 1950. He also served as the Chairman of the Stalingrad City Defense Committee from 1941 to 1943 during the Great Patriotic War. He was a member of the Military Council of the Stalingrad Front, Don Front, and Southern Front from 1942 to 1943.

During the Battle of Stalingrad, Chuyanov dealt with of the rear, as well as the reorganization of production for the needs of the front. With his assistance, work was clearly organized for the production of T-34 tanks and other military equipment, the preparation and processing of agricultural products, as well as the work of enterprises for the repair of equipment. Under Chuyanov's leadership, the Stalingrad Regional Committee formed People's Militias, Workers' Self-Defense Units, and plans for how to evacuate citizens and valuable government items from Stalingrad.

After serving as the First Secretary of the Stalingrad Committee, Chuyanov began working as the Head of the Main Directorate for Industrial and Consumer Cooperation under the Council of Ministers of the Soviet Union from 1946 to 1955. From 1955 to 1960, he worked in the State Committee for Labor and Wages of the Council of Ministers of the Soviet Union.

On May 4, 1970, by the decision of the Volgograd City Council of Workers' Deputies, Chuyanov was awarded the title of Honorary Citizen of the Hero City of Volgograd for "special merits shown in the defense of the city and the defeat of Nazi troops in the Battle of Stalingrad."

Death 
Aleksey Chuyanov died on February 20, 1977, in Moscow. He was buried at Mamayev Kurgan.

Awards 

  Order of Lenin (February 1942)
  Order of the October Revolution (March 28, 1975)
  Order of the Red Banner of Labour
  Medal "For the Defence of Stalingrad"
  Medal "For Valiant Labour in the Great Patriotic War 1941-1945"
  Honorary Citizen of the Hero City of Volgograd (May 4, 1970)

Gallery

See also 

 Volgograd Regional Committee of the Communist Party of the Soviet Union
 Battle of Stalingrad

References 

1905 births
1977 deaths
Recipients of the Order of Lenin
Politicians from Volgograd
Battle of Stalingrad
Soviet politicians